Air Marshal Ahmed Abdel Rahman Nasser (29 March 1934 – 15 February 2020) was a senior officer in the Egyptian Air Force. He graduated from the Egyptian Air Academy in 1956. He served as the commander of the Egyptian Air Force from 1990 until 1996, when he reached retirement age. Thereafter, he was Minister of Civil Aviation until 2002.

References

External links
Egyptian Armed Forces - Ahmed Abd El Rahman Nasr

 

|-

 

|-

Egyptian Air Force air marshals
1934 births
2020 deaths
Yom Kippur War pilots
Egyptian Air Academy alumni
Civil Aviation ministers of Egypt